La Vie du Rail is a French publishing group headquartered in Auray, which specialises in magazines and books about rail transport, and transport more generally. The editor-in-chief is Vincent Lalu.

In 1965 it became a weekly paid-for magazine independent of the SNCF, which retains a minority share in the company. The name then passed to the special-interest publishing house.

Titles
Since 2002, so as to diversify its customer base, la Vie du Rail has split its coverage and publishes:
 La Vie du Rail magazine, generalist weekly centring on rail transport with an average circulation of over 100,000.
  ("Town, rail & transport"): Initially weekly and titled Rail & Transport, it was then published every two weeks as Ville & transports magazine. In 2009 it merged with La Vie du rail international. It is aimed at those working in the transport sector.
 Historail, quarterly, specialising in rail history.
 Rail Passion, approximately 100-page monthly with an average circulation of 40,000 copies.

Commercial structure
Shares in the company are split between:
 Vincent Lalu et Associés, 71%
 SNCF, 10%
 , 5%
 Groupe La Vie-Le Monde, 5%
 Groupe Ouest-France, 5%
 Mutuelle d'assurance des artisans de France, 4%.

See also 
 List of railroad-related periodicals

Notes

External links
  La Vie du Rail, official website
  VDR Multimedia, Publisher's website

Book publishing companies of France
Magazine publishing companies of France
Mass media in Auray